Spathebothriidea is an order of Cestoda (tapeworms). Members of this order are gut parasites of fishes.

References

Cestoda
Platyhelminthes orders